Lukma Punta (Quechua lukma Pouteria lucuma, punta peak; ridge, "lúcuma peak (or ridge)", also spelled Lucmapunta) is a mountain in the Andes of Peru which reaches a height of approximately . It is located in the Ancash Region, Ocros Province, Ocros District.

References 

Mountains of Peru
Mountains of Ancash Region